He Fenglin (courtesy name Maoru; 1873–1935) was a general in the Republic of China. He belonged to the Anhui clique and the Fengtian clique.

Biography 
Born in Pingyin, Shandong, He Fenglin graduated the Beiyang Military Academy, then entered the New Army. Later he was promoted to be 15th regimental commander of the 8th Brigade, the 4th Division.

In May 1912 He Fenglin was promoted to be Commander of the 8th Brigade of the 4th Division. In next year he was transferred to Commander of the 7th Brigade of the 4th Division. When Yuan Shikai ascended to the throne in 1915, He Fenglin was awarded the title third-class Baron.

After the death of Yuan Shikai in 1916, He Fenglin belonged to the Anhui clique, commanded by Lu Yongxiang. In January 1917, He became Military Commissioner of the Ningtai (Ningbo and Taizhou), Zhejiang. In 1920, he was appointed acting Defense Commissioner of Shanghai and Commander of the 6th Mixed Brigade. In 1924, on the First Jiangsu-Zhejiang War, he participated as Commander of the 1st Army of the Shanghai United Army. During the war, Lu was defeated by Qi Xieyuan and Sun Chuanfang, so He also withdrew and escaped to Tianjin.

Later, he participated in the Fengtian clique. When Zhang Zuolin became Generalissimo, in June 1927, He Fenglin was catapulted to Minister of War, and also held the position of Supreme Commander of the Model Army Corps of the Anguojun. In April 1927, he was appointed Presiding Judge of the Military Tribunal, and passed a death sentence (by hanging) on Li Dazhao, the founder of the Communist Party of China.

After the collapse of the Beijing Government in June of the next year, He Fenglin resigned from his posts and escaped to the Northeast. In 1931 he was appointed Chief of the Councilor of the Commander‐in‐Chief's Office, Northeast Border Defence Army.

He Fenglin died in 1935. In 1936, he was posthumously promoted to lieutenant general.

References

Footnotes 
 "Pingyin Town" - "Introduction about People" The Website of the Information about Shandong Province(The Website of the Office of the Shandong Local History)
 
 
 

People from Jinan
National Revolutionary Army generals from Shandong
Military personnel of the Republic of China in the Second Sino-Japanese War
1873 births
1935 deaths